Byblia anvatara, the common joker, is a butterfly of the family Nymphalidae, found in Sub-Saharan Africa.

Wingspan: 38–43 mm in males and 40–45 mm in females. Its flight period is year round.

Larvae feed on Tragia glabrata and Dalechampia capensis.

Subspecies
Listed alphabetically:
B. a. acheloia (Wallengren, 1857) – Yemen, south-western Saudi Arabia, Sudan, Ethiopia, Somalia, Kenya, eastern Tanzania, Zambia, Mozambique, Zimbabwe, Botswana, northern Namibia, Eswatini, South Africa: Limpopo, Mpumalanga, North West, KwaZulu-Natal, Eastern Cape
B. a. anvatara (Boisduval, 1833) – Madagascar, Comoros
B. a. boydi Dixey, 1898 – Socotra
B. a. crameri Aurivillius, 1894 – eastern Senegal, Gambia, Guinea-Bissau, Burkina Faso, Guinea, Sierra Leone, Liberia, Ivory Coast, Ghana, Togo, Benin, Nigeria: south and the Cross River loop, Cameroon to Angola, Democratic Republic of the Congo, Uganda, Tanzania: north-west to the Kagera Region

References

External links
 Bode, J. (2012), Pirate & Joker Sap Sucking, feeding on sugary sap of Ziziphus mucronata tree, YouTube video

Butterflies described in 1833
Biblidinae